CUNA Mutual Group  is a mutual insurance company that provides financial services to cooperatives, credit unions, their members, and other customers worldwide. CUNA Mutual Group sells commercial and consumer insurance and protection products. CUNA Mutual Group provides retirement plan services to small businesses and credit union employees. The Madison, Wisconsin-based company also provides auto, home, life and loan protection products to credit union members through its TruStage brand.

History
The "CUNA" in the company's name originally stood for "Credit Union National Association". CUNA Mutual Group is the marketing name for CMFG Life Insurance Company, its subsidiaries, and affiliates.

CUNA Mutual Group was founded in 1935 as the CUNA Mutual Insurance Society. Its purpose was to offer financial protection to Americans during the credit union movement. After World War II, CUNA Mutual Group grew rapidly and expanded many of its services. CUNA Mutual Group began selling insurance products in 1983. It now serves over 30 million consumers across its lending, retirement, and wealth management products.

Locations
CUNA Mutual Group employs nearly 3,700 people in offices in Waverly, Iowa; Great Bend, Kansas; Fort Worth, Texas; and Madison, Wisconsin; as well as field employees located throughout the United States. There are 1,900 employees working in Madison, Wisconsin, the company's world headquarters.

The company's international locations include the Dominican Republic, Jamaica, Puerto Rico, and Trinidad and Tobago.

Services
CUNA Mutual Group sells a variety of insurance and investment products designed for credit unions and their members, including the following:

Insurance and payment protection services offered by CUNA Mutual Group include the following commercial and personal services.
Commercial: Bond, collateral protection, management and professional liability, plastic card, business automobile, IT/cyber solutions, mortgage insurance, property and business liability, workers compensation, and executive benefits
Personal: Credit insurance, debt protection, guaranteed asset protection, mortgage payment protection, mechanical repair coverage, life insurance, accidental death and dismemberment, health insurance, and auto and home insurance
Lending services include loan generation marketing, lending document management, compliance services, and lender development programs.
Wealth management and retirement services include broker/dealer services, pension and 401(k) plans, mutual funds, managed accounts, variable annuities, fixed annuities, and immediate annuities.

TruStage
TruStage is the brand name of a group of insurance products provided by CUNA Mutual Group. TruStage is the insurance arm of CUNA Mutual Group, which is rated "A" (Excellent; 3rd highest out of 16 possible ratings) by credit rating agency A.M. Best as of February 2017.

CUNA Mutual Group first registered the TruStage brand trademark in 2010, and it was first used commercially in 2013. The TruStage brand first sold insurance products commercially in 2013. It exceeded $1 billion in consumer coverage in 2017, and exceeded $6 billion in 2018.

TruStage also offers community service awards to students, such as the Community Spark Award.

Products
TruStage offers a range of insurance products, including whole and term life insurance, accidental death and dismemberment insurance, auto insurance, and property insurance. All products have various coverage amounts and age requirements.

TruStage life insurance products include:
Simplified whole life insurance: requires medical exams or questioning and pays a cash benefit if a person dies.
Guaranteed acceptance whole life insurance: does not require medical exams or questioning and pays a cash benefit if a person dies. 
Term life insurance: guarantees payment of a death benefit during a specified time period.

Additional TruStage insurance products include:
Accidental death and dismemberment insurance (underwritten by CMFG Life Insurance Company): pays a cash benefit if a person dies or is seriously injured in an accident.
Auto insurance (underwritten by Liberty Mutual and Esurance): offers coverage for cars, motorcycles, boats or watercraft, ATVs or off-road vehicles, and recreation vehicles (RV).
Home insurance (underwritten by Liberty Mutual and Esurance): offers coverage for homeowners, renters, or condo residents and their property.

References

External links
 CUNA Mutual Group (official website)
 TruStage (official site)

Companies based in Madison, Wisconsin
Financial services companies established in 1935
Credit unions of the United States
Insurance companies of the United States
Mutual insurance companies
1935 establishments in Wisconsin
Mutual insurance companies of the United States